The eighth American Basketball Association All-Star Game was played January 28, 1975 at HemisFair Arena in San Antonio, Texas before an audience at 10,449. Kevin Loughery of the New York Nets coached the East, with Larry Brown of the Denver Nuggets coached the West.

Freddie Lewis of the Spirits of St. Louis scored 12 of his game-high 26 points in the first period and was named the All-Star Game MVP.

Western Conference

Eastern Conference
 

Halftime — East, 70-60
Third Quarter — East, 109-90
Officials: Jack Madden and Jess Kersey
Attendance: 10,449.

References

External links 
 ABA All Star Game at RemembertheABA.com

All-Star
ABA All-star game
ABA All-star game